The 18th Standing Committee of the Central Commission for Discipline Inspection (CCDI) was elected at the 1st Plenary Session of the 18th CCDI on 15 November 2012.

Members

References
General
The 18th CCDI Standing Committee composition was taken from this source:
  
Specific

Central Commission for Discipline Inspection
2012 establishments in China